Musongati is a town in south-eastern Burundi.  It is near the border with Tanzania though separated therefrom by lofty hills.

Location
The geographical coordinates of Musongati are 3°47'53.0"S, 30°17'36.0"E (Latitude:-3.798056; Longitude:30.293333).

Overview
Musongati is the location of significant deposits of platinum, palladium, nickel, copper, gold and iron. The minerals are development by Burundi Mining Metallurgy (BMM), a public-private-partnership company, co-owned by Kermas Corporation (91 percent) and by the Government of Burundi (9 percent).

Transport
It is on the route of the proposed railway from Tanzania to the Burundi capital Gitega.
Therefore, there are unlimited contentions whether they should change the route since Musongati has Nickel deposit and has also numerous chutes of water.

See also
 Transport in Burundi
 Rwanda Standard Gauge Railway

References

Populated places in Burundi
Rutana Province